The 58th Annual Grammy Awards was held on February 15, 2016, at the Staples Center in Los Angeles. The ceremony recognizes the best recordings, compositions and artists of the eligibility year, which was from October 1, 2014, to September 30, 2015. The "pre-telecast" ceremony, officially known as the Premiere Ceremony, in which the majority of awards were presented, was held at the nearby Microsoft Theater. It was the 16th Grammy ceremony to be held at the Staples Center, tying the Shrine Auditorium in Los Angeles for hosting the most Grammy ceremonies. It also marks the latest date for a Grammy ceremony since 2003, which were held on February 23.

Unlike previous years, where it was held on a Sunday, the 2016 edition was held on a Monday for the first time to take advantage of the U.S. Presidents' Day long weekend. The ceremony was televised in the United States by CBS; for the first time, CBS affiliates in the West Coast and U.S. territories outside the continental region, including Hawaii and Alaska, had the option of broadcasting the Grammys live from the East coast feed, in addition to an encore in local primetime.

Nominations for the 58th Grammy Awards ceremony were announced on December 7, 2015, returning to the traditional format of an immediate press conference/release reveal of all nominees rather than the "all-day event" unveiling attempted by The Recording Academy and CBS over the previous few years. Kendrick Lamar received the most nominations with 11, and became the rapper with the most nominations in a single night, and second overall behind Michael Jackson (12 nominations in 1984). Taylor Swift and The Weeknd received seven nominations each. Producer Max Martin received the most nominations for a non-performing artist, with six. LL Cool J hosted for the fifth consecutive year. As part of a commercial break on the U.S. broadcast paid for by Target, Gwen Stefani also presented a live music video for her new single "Make Me Like You".

Kendrick Lamar led the winners with five trophies, including Best Rap Album for To Pimp a Butterfly. Taylor Swift won three awards, including Album of the Year for 1989, becoming the first female artist to win Album of the Year twice as main credited artist. Alabama Shakes also won three including Best Alternative Music Album for Sound & Color. Ed Sheeran won two including Song of the Year for "Thinking Out Loud". Mark Ronson and Bruno Mars' "Uptown Funk" won for  Record of the Year and Meghan Trainor won for Best New Artist.

Performers

Presenters

Nominees and winners

Note: Winners are listed in bold.

General
Record of the Year
"Uptown Funk" – Mark Ronson featuring Bruno Mars 
Jeff Bhasker, Philip Lawrence, Bruno Mars & Mark Ronson, producers; Josh Blair, Riccardo Damian, Serban Ghenea, Wayne Gordon, John Hanes, Inaam Haq, Boo Mitchell, Charles Moniz & Mark Ronson, engineers/mixers; Tom Coyne, mastering engineer
"Really Love" – D'Angelo and the Vanguard
D'Angelo & Brent Fischer, producers; Russell Elevado, Ben Kane & Rafa Sardina, engineers/mixers; Dave Collins, mastering engineer
"Thinking Out Loud" – Ed Sheeran
Jake Gosling, producer; Jake Gosling, Mark 'Spike' Stent & Geoff Swan, engineers/mixers; Stuart Hawkes, mastering engineer
"Blank Space" – Taylor Swift
Max Martin & Shellback, producers; Serban Ghenea, John Hanes, Sam Holland & Michael Ilbert, engineers/mixers; Tom Coyne, mastering engineer
"Can't Feel My Face" – The Weeknd
Max Martin & Ali Payami, producers; Serban Ghenea, John Hanes & Sam Holland, engineers/mixers; Tom Coyne, mastering engineer

Album of the Year
1989 – Taylor Swift
Jack Antonoff, Nathan Chapman, Imogen Heap, Max Martin, Mattman & Robin, Ali Payami, Shellback, Taylor Swift, Ryan Tedder & Noel Zancanella, producers; Jack Antonoff, Mattias Bylund, Smith Carlson, Nathan Chapman, Serban Ghenea, John Hanes, Imogen Heap, Sam Holland, Michael Ilbert, Brendan Morawski, Laura Sisk & Ryan Tedder, engineers/mixers; Tom Coyne, mastering engineer
Sound & Color – Alabama Shakes
Alabama Shakes & Blake Mills, producers; Shawn Everett, engineer/mixer; Bob Ludwig, mastering engineer
To Pimp a Butterfly – Kendrick Lamar
Bilal, George Clinton, James Fauntleroy, Ronald Isley, Rapsody, Snoop Dogg, Thundercat & Anna Wise, featured artists; Taz Arnold, Boi-1Da, Ronald Colson, Larrance Dopson, Flying Lotus, Fredrik "Tommy Black" Halldin, Knxwledge, Koz, Lovedragon, Terrace Martin, Rahki, Sounwave, Tae Beast, Thundercat, Whoarei & Pharrell Williams, producers; Derek "Mixedbyali" Ali, Thomas Burns, Andrew Coleman, Hart Gunther, James "The White Black Man" Hunt, Mike Larson, 9th Wonder & Matt Schaeffer, engineers/mixers; Mike Bozzi, mastering engineer
Traveller – Chris Stapleton
Dave Cobb & Chris Stapleton, producers; Vance Powell, engineer/mixer; Pete Lyman, mastering engineer
Beauty Behind the Madness – The Weeknd
Lana Del Rey, Labrinth & Ed Sheeran, featured artists; DannyBoyStyles, Mike Dean, Ben Diehl, Labrinth, Mano, Max Martin, Stephan Moccio, Carlo Montagnese, Ali Payami, The Pope, Jason Quenneville, Peter Svensson, Abel Tesfaye & Kanye West, producers; Jay Paul Bicknell, Mattias Bylund, Serban Ghenea, Noah Goldstein, John Hanes, Sam Holland, Jean Marie Horvat, Carlo Montagnese, Jason Quenneville & Dave Reitzas, engineers/mixers; Tom Coyne & Dave Kutch, mastering engineers

Song of the Year
"Thinking Out Loud"
Ed Sheeran & Amy Wadge, songwriters (Ed Sheeran)
"Alright"
Kendrick Duckworth, Mark Anthony Spears & Pharrell Williams, songwriters (Kendrick Lamar)
"Blank Space"
Max Martin, Shellback & Taylor Swift, songwriters (Taylor Swift)
"Girl Crush"
Hillary Lindsey, Lori McKenna & Liz Rose, songwriters (Little Big Town)
"See You Again"
Andrew Cedar, Justin Franks, Charlie Puth & Cameron Thomaz, songwriters (Wiz Khalifa Featuring Charlie Puth)

Best New Artist
Meghan Trainor
Courtney Barnett
James Bay
Sam Hunt
Tori Kelly

Pop
Best Pop Solo Performance
 "Thinking Out Loud" – Ed Sheeran
 "Heartbeat Song" – Kelly Clarkson
 "Love Me Like You Do" – Ellie Goulding
 "Blank Space" – Taylor Swift
 "Can't Feel My Face" – The Weeknd

Best Pop Duo/Group Performance
 "Uptown Funk" – Mark Ronson featuring Bruno Mars
 "Ship to Wreck" – Florence + The Machine
 "Sugar" – Maroon 5
 "Bad Blood" – Taylor Swift featuring Kendrick Lamar
 "See You Again" – Wiz Khalifa featuring Charlie Puth

Best Traditional Pop Vocal Album
 The Silver Lining: The Songs of Jerome Kern – Tony Bennett & Bill Charlap
 Shadows in the Night – Bob Dylan
 Stages – Josh Groban
 No One Ever Tells You – Seth MacFarlane
 My Dream Duets – Barry Manilow (& Various Artists)

Best Pop Vocal Album
1989 – Taylor Swift
 Piece by Piece – Kelly Clarkson
 How Big, How Blue, How Beautiful – Florence and the Machine
 Before This World – James Taylor
 Uptown Special – Mark Ronson

Dance/Electronic
Best Dance Recording
"Where Are Ü Now" – Skrillex and Diplo with Justin Bieber
Sonny Moore & Thomas Pentz, producers; Sonny Moore & Thomas Pentz, mixers
"We're All We Need" – Above & Beyond featuring Zoë Johnston
Andrew Bayer, Jono Grant, Tony McGuinness & Paavo Siljamäki, producers; Jono Grant, Tony McGuinness & Paavo Siljamäki, mixers
"Go" – The Chemical Brothers featuring Q-Tip
Tom Rowlands & Ed Simons, producers; Steve Dub Jones & Tom Rowlands, mixers
"Never Catch Me" – Flying Lotus featuring Kendrick Lamar
Steven Ellison, producer; Kevin Marques Moo, mixer
"Runaway (U & I)" – Galantis
Linus Eklöw, Christian Karlsson & Svidden, producers; Linus Eklöw, Niklas Flyckt & Christian Karlsson, mixers

Best Dance/Electronic Album
Skrillex and Diplo Present Jack Ü – Skrillex and Diplo
Our Love – Caribou
Born in the Echoes – The Chemical Brothers
Caracal – Disclosure
In Colour – Jamie xx

Contemporary Instrumental
Best Contemporary Instrumental Album
 Sylva – Snarky Puppy & Metropole Orkest
 Guitar in the Space Age! – Bill Frisell
 Love Language –  Wouter Kellerman
 Afrodeezia – Marcus Miller
 The Gospel According to Jazz, Chapter IV – Kirk Whalum

Rock
Best Rock Performance
 "Don't Wanna Fight" – Alabama Shakes
 "What Kind of Man" – Florence + The Machine
 "Something from Nothing" – Foo Fighters
 "Ex's & Oh's" – Elle King
 "Moaning Lisa Smile" – Wolf Alice

 Best Metal Performance
 "Cirice" – Ghost
 "Identity" – August Burns Red
 "512" – Lamb of God
 "Thank You" – Sevendust
 "Custer" – Slipknot

Best Rock Song
 "Don't Wanna Fight"
 Alabama Shakes, songwriters (Alabama Shakes)
 "Ex's & Oh's"
 Dave Bassett & Elle King, songwriters (Elle King)
 "Hold Back the River"
 Iain Archer & James Bay, songwriters (James Bay)
 "Lydia"
 Richard Meyer, Ryan Meyer & Johnny Stevens, songwriters (Highly Suspect)
 "What Kind of Man"
 John Hill, Tom Hull & Florence Welch, songwriters (Florence + The Machine)

Best Rock Album
 Drones – Muse
 Chaos and the Calm – James Bay
 Kintsugi – Death Cab for Cutie
 Mister Asylum – Highly Suspect
 .5: The Gray Chapter – Slipknot

Alternative
Best Alternative Music Album
 Sound & Color – Alabama Shakes
 Vulnicura – Björk
 The Waterfall – My Morning Jacket
 Currents – Tame Impala
 Star Wars – Wilco

R&B
Best R&B Performance
 "Earned It (Fifty Shades of Grey)" – The Weeknd
 "If I Don't Have You" – Tamar Braxton
 "Rise Up" – Andra Day
 "Breathing Underwater" – Hiatus Kaiyote
 "Planez" – Jeremih featuring J. Cole

Best Traditional R&B Performance
 "Little Ghetto Boy" – Lalah Hathaway
 "He Is" – Faith Evans
 "Let It Burn" – Jazmine Sullivan
 "Shame" – Tyrese
 "My Favorite Part of You" – Charlie Wilson

Best R&B Song
 "Really Love"
 D'Angelo, Gina Figueroa & Kendra Foster, songwriters (D'Angelo and The Vanguard)
 "Coffee"
 Brook Davis & Miguel Pimentel, songwriters (Miguel)
 "Earned It (Fifty Shades of Grey)"
 Ahmad Balshe, Stephan Moccio, Jason Quenneville & Abel Tesfaye, songwriters (The Weeknd)
 "Let It Burn"
 Kenny B. Edmonds, Jazmine Sullivan & Dwane M. Weir II, songwriters (Jazmine Sullivan)
 "Shame"
 Warryn Campbell, Tyrese Gibson & D.J. Rogers Jr, songwriters (Tyrese)

Best Urban Contemporary Album
 Beauty Behind the Madness – The Weeknd
 Ego Death – The Internet
 You Should Be Here – Kehlani
 Blood – Lianne La Havas
 Wildheart – Miguel

Best R&B Album
 Black Messiah – D'Angelo and The Vanguard
 Coming Home – Leon Bridges
 Cheers to the Fall – Andra Day
 Reality Show – Jazmine Sullivan
 Forever Charlie – Charlie Wilson

Rap
Best Rap Performance
 "Alright" – Kendrick Lamar
 "Apparently" – J. Cole
 "Back to Back" – Drake
 "Trap Queen" – Fetty Wap
 "Truffle Butter" – Nicki Minaj featuring Drake & Lil Wayne
 "All Day" – Kanye West featuring Theophilus London, Allan Kingdom & Paul McCartney

Best Rap/Sung Collaboration
 "These Walls" – Kendrick Lamar featuring Bilal, Anna Wise & Thundercat
 "One Man Can Change The World" – Big Sean featuring Kanye West & John Legend
 "Glory" – Common & John Legend
 "Classic Man" – Jidenna featuring Roman GianArthur
 "Only" – Nicki Minaj featuring Drake, Lil Wayne & Chris Brown

Best Rap Song
 "Alright"
 Kendrick Duckworth, Kawan Prather, Mark Anthony Spears & Pharrell Williams, songwriters (Kendrick Lamar)
 "All Day"
 Ernest Brown, Tyler Bryant, Sean Combs, Mike Dean, Rennard East, Noah Goldstein, Malik Yusef Jones, Karim Kharbouch, Allan Kyariga, Kendrick Lamar, Paul McCartney, Victor Mensah, Charles Njapa, Che Pope, Patrick Reynolds, Allen Ritter, Kanye West, Mario Winans & Cydel Young, songwriters (Kanye West Featuring Theophilus London, Allan Kingdom & Paul McCartney)
 "Energy"
 Richard Dorfmeister, A. Graham, Markus Kienzl, M. O'Brien, M. Samuels & Phillip Thomas, songwriters (Drake)
 "Glory"
 Lonnie Lynn, Che Smith & John Stephens, songwriters (Common & John Legend)
 "Trap Queen"
 Tony Fadd & Willie J. Maxwell, songwriters (Fetty Wap)

Best Rap Album
 To Pimp a Butterfly – Kendrick Lamar
 2014 Forest Hills Drive – J. Cole
 Compton – Dr. Dre
 If You're Reading This It's Too Late – Drake
 The Pinkprint – Nicki Minaj

Country
Best Country Solo Performance
 "Traveller" – Chris Stapleton
 "Burning House" – Cam
 "Little Toy Guns" – Carrie Underwood
 "John Cougar, John Deere, John 3:16" – Keith Urban
 "Chances Are" – Lee Ann Womack

Best Country Duo/Group Performance
 "Girl Crush" – Little Big Town
 "Stay a Little Longer" – Brothers Osborne
 "If I Needed You" – Joey + Rory
 "The Driver" – Charles Kelley featuring Dierks Bentley & Eric Paslay
 "Lonely Tonight" – Blake Shelton featuring Ashley Monroe

 Best Country Song
 "Girl Crush"
 Hillary Lindsey, Lori McKenna & Liz Rose, songwriters (Little Big Town)
 "Chances Are"
 Hayes Carll, songwriters (Lee Ann Womack)
 "Diamond Rings and Old Barstools"
 Barry Dean, Luke Laird & Jonathan Singleton, songwriters (Tim McGraw)
 "Hold My Hand"
 Brandy Clark & Mark Stephen Jones, songwriters (Brandy Clark)
 "Traveller"
 Chris Stapleton, songwriter (Chris Stapleton)

 Best Country Album
 Traveller – Chris Stapleton
 Montevallo – Sam Hunt
 Pain Killer – Little Big Town
 The Blade – Ashley Monroe
 Pageant Material – Kacey Musgraves

New Age
Best New Age Album
 Grace – Paul Avgerinos
 Bhakti without Borders – Madi Das
 Voyager – Catherine Duc
 Love – Peter Kater
 Asia Beauty – Ron Korb

Jazz
Best Improvised Jazz Solo
 "Cherokee" – Christian McBride, soloist
 "Giant Steps" – Joey Alexander, soloist
 "Arbiters of Evolution" – Donny McCaslin, soloist
 "Friend or Foe" – Joshua Redman, soloist
 "Past Present" – John Scofield, soloist

Best Jazz Vocal Album
 For One to Love – Cécile McLorin Salvant
 Many a New Day: Karrin Allyson Sings Rodgers & Hammerstein – Karrin Allyson
 Find a Heart – Denise Donatelli
 Flirting with Disaster – Lorraine Feather
 Jamison – Jamison Ross

Best Jazz Instrumental Album
 Past Present – John Scofield
 My Favorite Things – Joey Alexander
 Breathless – Terence Blanchard featuring The E-Collective
 Covered: Recorded Live at Capitol Studios – Robert Glasper & The Robert Glasper Trio
 Beautiful Life – Jimmy Greene

Best Large Jazz Ensemble Album
 The Thompson Fields – Maria Schneider Orchestra
 Lines of Color – Gil Evans Project
 Köln – Marshall Gilkes and WDR Big Band
 Cuba: The Conversation Continues – Arturo O'Farrill and the Afro Latin Jazz Orchestra
 Home Suite Home – Patrick Williams

Best Latin Jazz Album
 Made in Brazil – Eliane Elias
 Impromptu – The Rodriguez Brothers
 Suite Caminos – Gonzalo Rubalcaba
 Intercambio – Wayne Wallace Latin Jazz Quintet
 Identities are Changeable – Miguel Zenón

Gospel/Contemporary Christian Music
Best Gospel Performance/Song
 "Wanna Be Happy?" – Kirk Franklin
 Kirk Franklin, songwriter
 "Worth [Live]" – Anthony Brown & Group Therapy
 Anthony Brown, songwriter
 "Intentional" – Travis Greene
 Travis Greene, songwriter
 "How Awesome Is Our God [Live]" – Israel & Newbreed featuring Yolanda Adams
 Neville Diedericks, Israel Houghton & Meleasa Houghton, songwriters
 "Worth Fighting For [Live]" – Brian Courtney Wilson
 Aaron Lindsey & Brian Courtney Wilson, songwriters

Best Contemporary Christian Music Performance/Song
 "Holy Spirit" – Francesca Battistelli
 Bryan Torwalt & Katie Torwalt, songwriters
 "Lift Your Head Weary Sinner (Chains)" – Crowder
 Ed Cash, David Crowder & Seth Philpott, songwriters
 "Because He Lives (Amen)" – Matt Maher
 Daniel Carson, Ed Cash, Jason Ingram, Matt Maher & Chris Tomlin, songwriters
 "Soul on Fire" – Third Day featuring All Sons & Daughters
 Tai Anderson, Brenton Brown, David Carr, Mark Lee, Matt Maher & Mac Powell, songwriters
 "Feel It" – TobyMac featuring Mr. Talkbox
 Cary Barlowe, David Arthur Garcia & Toby McKeehan, songwriters

Best Gospel Album
 Covered: Alive in Asia [Live] (Deluxe) – Israel & Newbreed
 Destined to Win [Live] – Karen Clark Sheard
 Living It – Dorinda Clark-Cole
 One Place Live – Tasha Cobbs
 Life Music: Stage Two – Jonathan McReynolds

Best Contemporary Christian Music Album
 This Is Not a Test – TobyMac
 Whatever the Road – Jason Crabb
 How Can It Be – Lauren Daigle
 Saints and Sinners – Matt Maher
 Love Ran Red – Chris Tomlin

Best Roots Gospel Album
 Still Rockin' My Soul – The Fairfield Four
 Pray Now – Karen Peck and New River
 Directions Home (Songs We Love, Songs You Know) – Point of Grace

Latin
Best Latin Pop Album
 A Quien Quiera Escuchar (Deluxe Edition) – Ricky Martin
 Terral – Pablo Alborán
 Healer – Alex Cuba
 Sirope – Alejandro Sanz
 Algo Sucede – Julieta Venegas

Best Latin Rock Urban or Alternative Album
 Dale – Pitbull
 Hasta la Raíz – Natalia Lafourcade
 Amanecer – Bomba Estéreo
 Mondongo – La Cuneta Son Machín
 Caja de Música – Monsieur Periné

Best Regional Mexican Music Album (Including Tejano)
 Realidades – Deluxe Edition – Los Tigres del Norte
 Mi Vicio Más Grande – Banda El Recodo De Don Cruz Lizárraga
 Ya Dime Adiós – La Maquinaria Norteña
 Zapateando – Los Cojolites
 Tradición, Arte y Pasión – Mariachi Los Camperos De Nati Cano

Best Tropical Latin Album
 Son de Panamá – Rubén Blades with Roberto Delgado & Orquesta
 Tributo a Los Compadres: No Quiero Llanto – José Alberto "El Canario" & Septeto Santiaguero
 Presente Continuo – Guaco
 Todo Tiene Su Hora – Juan Luis Guerra 4.40
 Que Suenen los Tambores – Victor Manuelle

American Roots
Best American Roots Performance
 "See That My Grave Is Kept Clean" – Mavis Staples
 "And Am I Born to Die" – Béla Fleck & Abigail Washburn
 "Born to Play Guitar" – Buddy Guy
 "City of Our Lady" – The Milk Carton Kids
 "Julep" – Punch Brothers

Best American Roots Song
 "24 Frames"
 Jason Isbell, songwriter (Jason Isbell)
 "All Night Long"
 Raul Malo, songwriter (The Mavericks)
 "The Cost of Living"
 Don Henley & Stan Lynch, songwriters (Don Henley & Merle Haggard)
 "Julep"
 Chris Eldridge, Paul Kowert, Noam Pikelny, Chris Thile & Gabe Witcher, songwriters (Punch Brothers)
 "The Traveling Kind"
 Cory Chisel, Rodney Crowell & Emmylou Harris, songwriters (Emmylou Harris & Rodney Crowell)

Best Americana Album
 Something More Than Free – Jason Isbell
 The Firewatcher's Daughter – Brandi Carlile
 The Traveling Kind – Emmylou Harris & Rodney Crowell
 Mono – The Mavericks
 The Phosphorescent Blues – Punch Brothers

Best Bluegrass Album
 The Muscle Shoals Recordings – The SteelDrivers
 Pocket Full of Keys – Dale Ann Bradley
 Before the Sun Goes Down – Rob Ickes and Trey Hensley
 In Session – Doyle Lawson & Quicksilver
 Man of Constant Sorrow – Ralph Stanley and friends

Best Blues Album
 Born to Play Guitar – Buddy Guy
 Descendants of Hill Country – Cedric Burnside Project
 Outskirts of Love – Shemekia Copeland
 Worthy – Bettye LaVette
 Muddy Waters 100 – John Primer and various artists

Best Folk Album
 Béla Fleck & Abigail Washburn – Béla Fleck and Abigail Washburn
 Wood, Wire & Words – Norman Blake
 Tomorrow Is My Turn – Rhiannon Giddens
 Servant of Love – Patty Griffin
 Didn't He Ramble – Glen Hansard

Best Regional Music Album
 Go Go Juice  – Jon Cleary
 La La La La – Natalie Ai Kamauu
 Kawaiokalena – Kealiʻi Reichel
 Get Ready – The Revelers
 Generations – Windwalker and the MCW

Reggae
Best Reggae Album
 Strictly Roots – Morgan Heritage
 Branches of the Same Tree – Rocky Dawuni
 The Cure – Jah Cure
 Acousticalevy – Barrington Levy
 Zion Awake – Luciano

World Music
Best World Music Album
 Sings – Angélique Kidjo
 Gilbertos Samba Ao Vivo – Gilberto Gil
 Music from Inala – Ladysmith Black Mambazo with Ella Spira and The Inala Ensemble
 Home – Anoushka Shankar
 I Have No Everything Here – Zomba Prison Project

Children's
 Best Children's Album
 Home – Tim Kubart
 ¡Come Bien! Eat Right! – José-Luis Orozco
 Dark Pie Concerns – Gustafer Yellowgold
 How Great Can This Day Be – Lori Henriques
 Trees – Molly Ledford & Billy Kelly

Spoken Word
Best Spoken Word Album (Includes Poetry, Audio Books and Storytelling)
 A Full Life: Reflections at Ninety – Jimmy Carter
 Blood on Snow (Jo Nesbø) – Patti Smith
 Brief Encounters: Conversations, Magic Moments, and Assorted Hijinks – Dick Cavett
 Patience and Sarah (Isabel Miller) – Janis Ian & Jean Smart
 Yes Please – Amy Poehler (& Various Artists)

Comedy
Best Comedy Album
 Live at Madison Square Garden – Louis C.K.
 Back to the Drawing Board – Lisa Lampanelli
 Brooklyn – Wyatt Cenac
 Happy. And a Lot. – Jay Mohr
 Just Being Honest – Craig Ferguson

Musical Theatre
Best Musical Theater Album
 Hamilton – Daveed Diggs, Renée Elise Goldsberry, Jonathan Groff, Christopher Jackson, Jasmine Cephas Jones, Lin-Manuel Miranda, Leslie Odom, Jr., Okieriete Onaodowan, Anthony Ramos & Phillipa Soo, principal soloists; Alex Lacamoire, Lin-Manuel Miranda, Bill Sherman, Ahmir Thompson & Tariq Trotter, producers; Lin-Manuel Miranda, composer & lyricist (Original Broadway Cast)
 An American In Paris – Leanne Cope, Max Von Essen, Robert Fairchild, Jill Paice & Brandon Uranowitz, principal soloists; Rob Fisher & Scott Lehrer, producers (George Gershwin, composer; Ira Gershwin, lyricist) (Original Broadway Cast)
 Fun Home – Michael Cerveris, Judy Kuhn, Sydney Lucas, Beth Malone & Emily Skeggs, principal soloists; Philip Chaffin & Tommy Krasker, producers (Jeanine Tesori, composer; Lisa Kron, lyricist) (Original Broadway Cast)
 The King and I – Ruthie Ann Miles, Kelli O'Hara, Ashley Park, Conrad Ricamora & Ken Watanabe, principal soloists; David Caddick, David Lai & Ted Sperling, producers (Richard Rodgers, composer; Oscar Hammerstein II, lyricist) (2015 Broadway Cast)
 Something Rotten! – Heidi Blickenstaff, Christian Borle, John Cariani, Brian d'Arcy James, Brad Oscar & Kate Reinders, principal soloists; Kurt Deutsch, Karey Kirkpatrick, Wayne Kirkpatrick, Lawrence Manchester, Kevin McCollum & Phil Reno, producers; Karey Kirkpatrick & Wayne Kirkpatrick, composers/lyricists (Original Broadway Cast)

Music for Visual Media
Best Compilation Soundtrack for Visual Media
 Glen Campbell: I'll Be Me – various artists
 Julian Raymond, compilation producer
 Empire: Season 1 – various artists
 Timbaland & Jim Beanz, compilation producers
 Fifty Shades of Grey – various artists
 Mike Knobloch & Dana Sano, compilation producers
 Pitch Perfect 2 – various artists
 Julianne Jordan, Harvey Mason Jr. & Julia Michels, compilation producers
 Selma – various artists
 Ava DuVernay, compilation producer

Best Score Soundtrack for Visual Media
 Birdman – Antonio Sánchez, composer The Imitation Game – Alexandre Desplat, composer
 Interstellar – Hans Zimmer, composer
 The Theory of Everything – Jóhann Jóhannsson, composer
 Whiplash – Justin Hurwitz, composerBest Song Written for Visual Media "Glory" (from Selma) – Lonnie Lynn, Che Smith & John Stephens, songwriters (Common & John Legend)
 "Earned It" (from Fifty Shades of Grey) – Ahmad Balshe, Jason Quenneville, Stephan Moccio & Abel Tesfaye, songwriters (The Weeknd)
 "Love Me like You Do" (from Fifty Shades of Grey) – Savan Kotecha, Max Martin, Tove Nilsson, Ali Payami, & Ilya Salmanzadeh, songwriters (Ellie Goulding)
 "See You Again" (from Furious 7) – Andrew Cedar, Justin Franks, Charles Puth & Cameron Thomaz, songwriters (Wiz Khalifa featuring Charlie Puth)
 "Til It Happens to You" (from The Hunting Ground) – Lady Gaga & Diane Warren, songwriters (Lady Gaga)

ComposingBest Instrumental Composition "The Afro Latin Jazz Suite" Arturo O'Farrill, composer (Arturo O'Farrill & The Afro Latin Jazz Orchestra featuring Rudresh Mahanthappa)
 "Civil War"
 Bob Mintzer, composer (Bob Mintzer Big Band)
 "Confetti Man"
 David Balakrishnan, composer (Turtle Island Quartet)
 "Neil"
 Rich DeRosa, composer (University of North Texas College of Music, One O'Clock Lab Band)
 "Vesper"
 Marshall Gilkes, composer (Marshall Gilkes & WDR Big Band)

ArrangingBest Arrangement, Instrumental or A Cappella "Dance of the Sugar Plum Fairy" Ben Bram, Mitch Grassi, Scott Hoying, Avi Kaplan, Kirstie Maldonado and Kevin Olusola, arrangers (Pentatonix)
 "Bruno Mars"
 Paul Allen, Troy Hayes, Evin Martin & J Moss, arrangers (Vocally Challenged)
 "Do You Hear What I Hear?"
 Armand Hutton, arranger (Committed)
 "Ghost of a Chance"
 Bob James, arranger (Bob James & Nathan East)
 "You and the Night and the Music"
 John Fedchock, arranger (John Fedchock New York Big Band)Best Arrangement, Instruments and Vocals "Sue (Or in a Season of Crime)" Maria Schneider, arranger (David Bowie)
 "Be My Muse"
 Shelly Berg, arranger (Lorraine Feather)
 "52nd & Broadway"
 Patrick Williams, arranger (Patrick Williams featuring Patti Austin)
 "Garota de Ipanema"
 Otmaro Ruiz, arranger (Catina DeLuna featuring Otmaro Ruiz)
 "When I Come Home"
 Jimmy Greene, arranger (Jimmy Greene with Javier Colon)

PackagingBest Recording Package Still the King: Celebrating the Music of Bob Wills and His Texas Playboys
 Sarah Dodds, Shauna Dodds & Dick Reeves, art directors (Asleep at the Wheel)
 Alagoas
 Alex Trochut, art director (Alagoas)
 Bush
 Anita Marisa Boriboon & Phi Hollinger, art directors (Snoop Dogg)
 How Big, How Blue, How Beautiful (Deluxe Edition)
 Brian Roettinger, art director (Florence + The Machine)
 My Happiness
 Nathanio Strimpopulos & Jack White, art directors (Elvis Presley)

Best Boxed or Special Limited Edition Package
 The Rise & Fall of Paramount Records, Volume Two (1928–32)
 Susan Archie, Dean Blackwood & Jack White, art directors (Various Artists)
 Beneath the Skin (Deluxe Box Set)
 Leif Podhajsky, art director (Of Monsters and Men)
 I Love You, Honeybear (Limited Edition Deluxe Vinyl)
 Sasha Barr & Josh Tillman, art directors (Father John Misty)
 Sticky Fingers (Super Deluxe Edition)
 Stephen Kennedy & James Tilley, art directors (The Rolling Stones)
 30 Trips Around the Sun
 Doran Tyson & Steve Vance, art directors (Grateful Dead)
 What a Terrible World, What a Beautiful World (Deluxe Box Set)
 Carson Ellis, Jeri Heiden & Glen Nakasako, art directors (The Decemberists)

Notes
Best Album Notes
 Love Has Many Faces: A Quartet, A Ballet, Waiting to Be Danced
 Joni Mitchell, album notes writer (Joni Mitchell)
 Folksongs of Another America: Field Recordings from the Upper Midwest, 1937–1946
 James P. Leary, album notes writer (Various Artists)
 Lead Belly: The Smithsonian Folkways Collection
 Jeff Place, album notes writer (Lead Belly)
 Portrait of an American Singer
 Ted Olson, album notes writer (Tennessee Ernie Ford)
 Songs of the Night: Dance Recordings, 1916–1925
 Ryan Barna, album notes writer (Joseph C. Smith's Orchestra)

Historical
Best Historical Album
 The Basement Tapes Complete: The Bootleg Series Vol. 11
 Steve Berkowitz, Jan Haust & Jeff Rosen, compilation producers; Peter J. Moore & Mark Wilder, mastering engineers (Bob Dylan And The Band)
 The Complete Concert by the Sea
 Geri Allen, Jocelyn Arem & Steve Rosenthal, compilation producers; Jamie Howarth & Jessica Thompson, mastering engineers (Erroll Garner)
 Native North America (Vol. 1): Aboriginal Folk, Rock, and Country 1966–1985
 Kevin Howes, compilation producer; Greg Mindorff, mastering engineer (Various Artists)
 Parchman Farm: Photographs and Field Recordings, 1947–1959
 Steven Lance Ledbetter & Nathan Salsburg, compilation producers; Michael Graves, mastering engineer (Various Artists)
 Songs My Mother Taught Me
 Mark Puryear, compilation producer; Pete Reiniger, mastering engineer (Fannie Lou Hamer)

Engineered Album
Best Engineered Album, Non-Classical
 Sound & Color
 Shawn Everett, engineer; Bob Ludwig, mastering engineer (Alabama Shakes)
 Before This World
 Dave O'Donnell, engineer; Ted Jensen, mastering engineer (James Taylor)
 Currency of Man
 Maxime Le Guil, engineer; Bernie Grundman, mastering engineer (Melody Gardot)
 Recreational Love
 Greg Kurstin & Alex Pasco, engineers; Emily Lazar, mastering engineer (The Bird And The Bee)
 Wallflower
 Steve Price, Jochem van der Saag & Jorge Vivo, engineers; Paul Blakemore, mastering engineer (Diana Krall)

Best Engineered Album, Classical
 Ask Your Mama
 Leslie Ann Jones, John Kilgore, Nora Kroll-Rosenbaum & Justin Merrill, engineers; Patricia Sullivan, mastering engineer (George Manahan & San Francisco Ballet Orchestra)
 Dutilleux: Métaboles; L'Arbre Des Songes; Symphony No. 2, 'Le Double
 Dmitriy Lipay, engineer; Alexander Lipay, mastering engineer (Ludovic Morlot, Augustin Hadelich & Seattle Symphony)
 Monteverdi: Il Ritorno D'Ulisse In Patria
 Robert Friedrich, engineer; Michael Bishop, mastering engineer (Martin Pearlman, Jennifer Rivera, Fernando Guimarães & Boston Baroque)
 Rachmaninoff: All-Night Vigil
 Byeong Joon Hwang & John Newton, engineers; Mark Donahue, mastering engineer (Charles Bruffy, Phoenix Chorale & Kansas City Chorale)
 Saint-Saëns: Symphony No. 3, 'Organ'
 Keith O. Johnson & Sean Royce Martin, engineers; Keith O. Johnson, mastering engineer (Michael Stern & Kansas City Symphony);

Producer
Producer of the Year, Non-Classical
 Jeff Bhasker
 "Ain't Gonna Drown" (Elle King)
 "Burning Doves" (Mikky Ekko)
 "Burning House" (Cam)
 Grand Romantic (Nate Ruess)
 "Last Damn Night" (Elle King)
 "Never Let You Down" (Woodkid featuring Lykke Li)
 "Runaway Train" (Cam)
 Uptown Special (Mark Ronson)
 Dave Cobb
 Delilah (Anderson East)
 Little Neon Limelight (Houndmouth)
 "Smoke" (A Thousand Horses)
 Something More Than Free (Jason Isbell)
 Southernality (A Thousand Horses)
 3 (honeyhoney)
 Traveller (Chris Stapleton)
 Diplo
 "Bitch I'm Madonna" (Madonna featuring Nicki Minaj)
 "Doctor Pepper" (Diplo featuring CL, Riff Raff & OG Maco)
 "Golden" (Travie McCoy featuring Sia)
 "Lean On" (Major Lazer featuring MØ & DJ Snake)
 Peace Is the Mission (Major Lazer)
 Skrillex and Diplo Present Jack Ü (Skrillex and Diplo)
 "Where Are Ü Now" (Skrillex And Diplo With Justin Bieber)
 Larry Klein
 Currency of Man (Melody Gardot)
 Freedom & Surrender (Lizz Wright)
 Heartland (Indra Rios-Moore)
 I'm Leaving You (Florence K)
 Parker's Place (Parker Bent)
 Speaking in Tongues (Luciana Souza)
 Tenderness (JD Souther)
 Blake Mills
 Sound & Color (Alabama Shakes)

Producer of the Year, Classical
 Judith Sherman
 Ask Your Mama (George Manahan & San Francisco Ballet Orchestra)
 Fields: Double Cluster; Space Sciences (Jan Kučera, Gloria Chuang & Moravian Philharmonic Orchestra)
 Liaisons – Re-Imagining Sondheim from the Piano (Anthony de Mare)
 Montage – Great Film Composers & the Piano (Gloria Cheng)
 Multitude, Solitude (Momenta Quartet)
 Of Color Braided All Desire – Music of Eric Moe (Christine Brandes, Brentano String Quartet, Dominic Donato, Jessica Meyer, Karen Ouzounian, Manhattan String Quartet & Talujon)
 Rzewski: The People United Will Never Be Defeated! (Ursula Oppens)
 Sirota: Parting the Veil – Works for Violin & Piano (David Friend, Hyeyung Julie Yoon, Laurie Carney & Soyeon Kate Lee)
 Turina: Chamber Music for Strings & Piano (Lincoln Trio)
 Blanton Alspaugh
 Hill: Symphony No. 4; Concertino Nos. 1 & 2; Divertimento (Peter Bay, Anton Nel & Austin Symphony Orchestra)
 Rachmaninoff: All-Night Vigil (Charles Bruffy, Phoenix Chorale & Kansas City Chorale)
 Sacred Songs of Life & Love (Brian A. Schmidt & South Dakota Chorale)
 Spirit of the American Range (Carlos Kalmar & The Oregon Symphony)
 Tower: Violin Concerto; Stroke; Chamber Dance (Giancarlo Guerrero, Cho-Liang Lin & Nashville Symphony)
 Manfred Eicher
 Franz Schubert (András Schiff)
 Galina Ustvolskaya (Patricia Kopatchinskaja, Markus Hinterhäuser & Reto Bieri)
 Moore: Dances & Canons (Saskia Lankhoorn)
 Rihm: Et Lux (Paul Van Nevel, Minguet Quartet & Huelgas Ensemble)
 Visions Fugitives (Anna Gourari)
 Marina A. Ledin, Victor Ledin
 Dances for Piano & Orchestra (Joel Fan, Christophe Chagnard & Northwest Sinfonietta)
 Tempo do Brasil (Marc Regnier)
 Woman at the New Piano (Nadia Shpachenko)
 Dan Merceruio
 Chapí: String Quartets 1 & 2 (Cuarteto Latinoamericano)
 From Whence We Came (Ensemble Galilei)
 Gregson: Touch (Peter Gregson)
 In the Light of Air – ICE Performs Anna Thorvaldsdottir (International Contemporary Ensemble)
 Schumann (Ying Quartet)
 Scrapyard Exotica (Del Sol String Quartet)
 Stravinsky: Petrushka (Richard Scerbo & Inscape Chamber Orchestra)
 What Artemisia Heard (El Mundo)
 ZOFO Plays Terry Riley (ZOFO)

Remixer
Best Remixed Recording, Non-Classical
 "Uptown Funk" (Dave Audé Remix)
 Dave Audé, remixer (Mark Ronson featuring Bruno Mars)
 "Berlin by Overnight" (CFCF Remix)
 CFCF, remixer (Daniel Hope)
 "Hold On" (Fatum Remix)
 Bill Hamel & Chad Newbold, remixers (JES with Shant & Clint Maximus)
 "Runaway (U & I)" (Kaskade Remix)
 Ryan Raddon, remixer (Galantis)
 "Say My Name" (RAC Remix)
 André Allen Anjos, remixer (Odesza featuring Zyra)

Surround Sound
Best Surround Sound Album
 Amused to Death
 James Guthrie, surround mix engineer; James Guthrie & Joel Plante, surround mastering engineers; James Guthrie, surround producer (Roger Waters)
 Amdahl: Astrognosia & Aesop
 Morten Lindberg, surround mix engineer; Morten Lindberg, surround mastering engineer; Morten Lindberg, surround producer (Ingar Heine Bergby & Norwegian Radio Orchestra)
 Magnificat
 Morten Lindberg, surround mix engineer; Morten Lindberg, surround mastering engineer; Morten Lindberg, surround producer (Øyvind Gimse, Anita Brevik, Nidarosdomens Jentekor & TrondheimSolistene)
 Shostakovich: Symphony No. 7
 Erdo Groot, surround mix engineer; Erdo Groot, surround mastering engineer; Philip Traugott, surround producer (Paavo Järvi & Russian National Orchestra)
 Spes
 Morten Lindberg, surround mix engineer; Morten Lindberg, surround mastering engineer; Morten Lindberg, surround producer (Tove Ramlo-Ystad & Cantus)

Classical
Performers who are not eligible for an award (such as orchestras, choirs, or soloists) are mentioned in parentheses

Best Orchestral Performance
 Shostakovich: Under Stalin's Shadow – Symphony No. 10
 Andris Nelsons, conductor (Boston Symphony Orchestra)
 Bruckner: Symphony No. 4
 Manfred Honeck, conductor (Pittsburgh Symphony Orchestra)
 Dutilleux: Métaboles; L'Arbre Des Songes; Symphony No. 2, 'Le Double'
 Ludovic Morlot, conductor (Seattle Symphony)
 Spirit of the American Range
 Carlos Kalmar, conductor (Oregon Symphony)
 Zhou Long & Chen Yi: Symphony 'Humen 1839 Darrell Ang, conductor (New Zealand Symphony Orchestra)Best Opera Recording Ravel: L'Enfant Et Les Sortilèges; Shéhérazade Seiji Ozawa, conductor; Isabel Leonard; Dominic Fyfe, producer (Saito Kinen Orchestra; SKF Matsumoto Chorus & SKF Matsumoto Children's Chorus)
 Janáček: Jenůfa
 Donald Runnicles, conductor; Will Hartmann, Michaela Kaune & Jennifer Larmore; Magdalena Herbst, producer (Orchestra of the Deutsche Oper Berlin; Chorus of the Deutsche Oper Berlin)
 Monteverdi: Il Ritorno D'Ulisse In Patria
 Martin Pearlman, conductor; Fernando Guimarães & Jennifer Rivera; Thomas C. Moore, producer (Boston Baroque)
 Mozart: Die Entführung Aus Dem Serail
 Yannick Nézet-Séguin, conductor; Diana Damrau, Paul Schweinester & Rolando Villazón; Sid McLauchlan, producer (Chamber Orchestra of Europe)
 Steffani: Niobe, Regina Di Tebe
 Paul O'Dette & Stephen Stubbs, conductors; Karina Gauvin & Philippe Jaroussky; Renate Wolter-Seevers, producer (Boston Early Music Festival Orchestra)Best Choral Performance Rachmaninoff: All-Night Vigil Charles Bruffy, conductor (Paul Davidson, Frank Fleschner, Toby Vaughn Kidd, Bryan Pinkall, Julia Scozzafava, Bryan Taylor & Joseph Warner; Phoenix Chorale & Kansas City Chorale)
 Beethoven: Missa Solemnis
 Bernard Haitink, conductor; Peter Dijkstra, chorus master (Anton Barachovsky, Genia Kühmeier, Elisabeth Kulman, Hanno Müller-Brachmann & Mark Padmore; Symphonieorchester des Bayerischen Rundfunks; Chor des Bayerischen Rundfunks)
 Monteverdi: Vespers Of 1610
 Harry Christophers, conductor (Jeremy Budd, Grace Davidson, Ben Davies, Mark Dobell, Eamonn Dougan & Charlotte Mobbs; The Sixteen)
 Pablo Neruda – The Poet Sings
 Craig Hella Johnson, conductor (James K. Bass, Laura Mercado-Wright, Eric Neuville & Lauren Snouffer; Faith DeBow & Stephen Redfield; Conspirare)
 Paulus: Far in the Heavens
 Eric Holtan, conductor (Sara Fraker, Matthew Goinz, Thea Lobo, Owen McIntosh, Kathryn Mueller & Christine Vivona; True Concord Orchestra; True Concord Voices)Best Chamber Music/Small Ensemble Performance Filament Eighth Blackbird
 Brahms: The Piano Trios
 Tanja Tetzlaff, Christian Tetzlaff & Lars Vogt
 Flaherty: Airdancing for Toy Piano, Piano & Electronics
 Nadia Shpachenko & Genevieve Feiwen Lee
 Render
 Brad Wells & Roomful of Teeth
 Shostakovich: Piano Quintet & String Quartet No. 2
 Takács Quartet & Marc-André Hamelin Best Classical Instrumental Solo Dutilleux: Violin Concerto, L'Arbre Des Songes Augustin Hadelich; Ludovic Morlot, conductor (Seattle Symphony)
 Grieg & Moszkowski: Piano Concertos
 Joseph Moog; Nicholas Milton, conductor (Deutsche Radio Philharmonie Saarbrücken Kaiserslautern)
 Mozart: Keyboard Music, Vol. 7
 Kristian Bezuidenhout
 Rachmaninov Variations
 Daniil Trifonov (Philadelphia Orchestra)
 Rzewski: The People United Will Never Be Defeated!
 Ursula Oppens (Jerome Lowenthal)Best Classical Solo Vocal Album Joyce & Tony – Live from Wigmore Hall Joyce DiDonato; Antonio Pappano, accompanist
 Beethoven: An Die Ferne Geliebte; Haydn: English Songs; Mozart: Masonic Cantata
 Mark Padmore; Kristian Bezuidenhout, accompanist
 Nessun Dorma – The Puccini Album
 Jonas Kaufmann; Antonio Pappano, conductor (Kristīne Opolais, Antonio Pirozzi & Massimo Simeoli; Coro Dell'Accademia Nazionale Di Santa Cecilia; Orchestra Dell'Accademia Nazionale Di Santa Cecilia)
 Rouse: Seeing; Kabir Padavali
 Talise Trevigne; David Alan Miller, conductor (Orion Weiss; Albany Symphony Orchestra)
 St. Petersburg
 Cecilia Bartoli; Diego Fasolis, conductor (I Barocchisti)Best Classical Compendium Paulus: Three Places of Enlightenment; Veil of Tears & Grand Concerto Giancarlo Guerrero, conductor; Tim Handley, producer
 As Dreams Fall Apart – The Golden Age of Jewish Stage and Film Music (1925–1955)
 New Budapest Orpheum Society; Jim Ginsburg, producer
 Ask Your Mama
 George Manahan, conductor; Judith Sherman, producer
 Handel: L'Allegro, Il Penseroso Ed Il Moderato, 1740
 Paul McCreesh, conductor; Nicholas Parker, producer
 Woman at the New Piano
 Nadia Shpachenko; Marina A. Ledin & Victor Ledin, producersBest Contemporary Classical Composition Paulus: Prayers & Remembrances Stephen Paulus, composer (Eric Holtan, True Concord Voices & Orchestra)
 Barry: The Importance of Being Earnest
 Gerald Barry, composer (Thomas Adès, Barbara Hannigan, Katalin Károlyi, Hilary Summers, Peter Tantsits & Birmingham Contemporary Music Group)
 Norman: Play
 Andrew Norman, composer (Gil Rose & Boston Modern Orchestra Project)
 Tower: Stroke
 Joan Tower, composer (Giancarlo Guerrero, Cho-Liang Lin & Nashville Symphony)
 Wolfe: Anthracite Fields
 Julia Wolfe, composer (Julian Wachner, The Choir of Trinity Wall Street & Bang on a Can All Stars)

Music Video/FilmBest Music Video"Bad Blood" – Taylor Swift featuring Kendrick Lamar
Joseph Kahn, video director; Ron Mohrhoff, video producer
"LSD" – ASAP Rocky
 Dexter Navy, video director; Shin Nishigaki, video producer
"I Feel Love (Every Million Miles)" – The Dead Weather
Cooper Roberts & Ian Schwartz, video directors; Candice Dragonas & Nathan Scherrer, video producers
"Alright" – Kendrick Lamar
The Little Homies & Colin Tilley, video directors; Brandon Bonfiglio, Dave Free, Andrew Lerios & Luga Podesta, video producers
"Freedom" – Pharrell Williams
Paul Hunter, video director; Candice Dragonas & Nathan Scherrer, video producersBest Music FilmAmy''' – (Amy Winehouse)
 Asif Kapadia, video director; James Gay-Rees, video producerMr. Dynamite: The Rise of James Brown – (James Brown)
 Alex Gibney, video director; Peter Afterman, Blair Foster, Mick Jagger & Victoria Pearman, video producersSonic Highways – Foo Fighters
 Dave Grohl, video director; John Cutcliffe, John Silva, Gaby Skolnek & Kristen Welsh, video producersWhat Happened, Miss Simone? – (Nina Simone)
 Liz Garbus, video director; Liz Garbus, Amy Hobby, Jayson Jackson & Justin Wilkes, video producersThe Wall'' – Roger Waters
 Sean Evans & Roger Waters, video directors; Clare Spencer & Roger Waters, video producers

Special Merit Awards

MusiCares Person of the Year
 Lionel Richie

Lifetime Achievement Award
 Ruth Brown
 Celia Cruz
 Earth, Wind & Fire
 Herbie Hancock
 Jefferson Airplane
 Linda Ronstadt
 Run-DMC

Trustees Award
 John Cage
 Fred Foster
 Chris Strachwitz

Technical Grammy Award
 EMT
 Harvey Fletcher

Music Educator Award
 Phillip Riggs (of North Carolina School of Science and Mathematics in Durham, North Carolina)

Grammy Hall of Fame inductions

In Memoriam
The following individuals were, in order, included in the ceremony's 'In Memoriam' film

 Allen Toussaint
 Maurice White
 B.B. King
 Glenn Frey
 David Bowie
 Ben E. King
 Signe Toly Anderson
 Paul Kantner
 Dan Hicks
 Lemmy Kilmister
 Scott Weiland
 Chris Squire
 Gary Richrath
 Lesley Gore
 Lynn Anderson
 Billy Joe Royal
 Buddy Emmons
 Johnny Gimble
 Billy Sherrill
 Percy Sledge
 Michael Masser
 William Guest
 Yvonne Wright
 Mic Gillette
 Joseph Robinson Jr.
 Kool DJ AJ
 Big Kap
 Joan Sebastian
 Clark Terry
 Ornette Coleman
 Phil Woods
 Paul Bley
 Orrin Keepnews
 James Horner
 Robert Stigwood
 Bruce Lundvall
 Billy Ray Hearn
 Stan Cornyn
 Jerry Weintraub
 René Angélil
 Larry Rosen
 Doug Sax
 Cory Wells
 Al Bunetta
 Bill Arhos
 Stan Freberg
 Jimmie Haskell
 Pierre Boulez
 Kurt Masur
 Robert Craft
 Gunther Schuller
 Bobbie Bailey
 Natalie Cole

Multiple nominations and awards

The following artists received multiple nominations:
Eleven: Kendrick Lamar
Seven: Taylor Swift, The Weeknd
Six: Max Martin
Five: Florence + the Machine, Tom Coyne, Drake, Serban Ghenea, John Hanes
Four: Alabama Shakes, Sam Holland, John Legend, Ali Payami, Ed Sheeran, Chris Stapleton, Florence Welch, Kanye West, Pharrell Williams
Three: James Bay, J. Cole, Common, D'Angelo, Diplo, Wiz Khalifa, Morten Lindberg, Matt Maher, Nicki Minaj, Stephan Moccio, Punch Brothers, Charlie Puth, Jason Quenneville, Mark Ronson, Shellback, Jazmine Sullivan
Two: Joey Alexander, Kristian Bezuidenhout, Jeff Bhasker, Bilal, Mattias Bylund, Andrew Cedar, The Chemical Brothers, Kelly Clarkson, Dave Cobb, Andra Day, DJ Frank E, Shawn Everett, Béla Fleck, Flying Lotus, Foo Fighters, Marshall Gilkes, Noah Goldstein, Jimmy Greene, Buddy Guy, Emmylou Harris, Highly Suspect, Sam Hunt, Michael Ilbert, Jason Isbell, Israel & Newbreed, Elle King, Marina A. Ledin, Victor Ledin, Lil Wayne, Hillary Lindsey, Little Big Town, Bob Ludwig, Raul Malo, Bruno Mars, Paul McCartney, Lori McKenna, Miguel, Blake Mills, Ashley Monroe, Ludovic Morlot, Arturo O'Farrill, Antonio Pappano, Liz Rose, Nathan Scherrer, Maria Schneider, John Scofield, Judith Sherman, Nadia Shpachenko, Skrillex, Slipknot, Mark Anthony Spears, Thundercat, Tobymac, Tyrese, Fetty Wap, Abigail Washburn, Patrick Williams, Charlie Wilson, Anna Wise

The following artists received multiple awards:
Five: Kendrick Lamar
Three: Alabama Shakes, Serban Ghenea, John Hanes, Taylor Swift
Two: Jeff Bhasker, Tom Coyne, D'Angelo, Diplo, Sam Holland, Jason Isbell, Bruno Mars, Mark Ronson, Maria Schneider, Max Martin, Ed Sheeran, Shellback, Skrillex, Chris Stapleton, The Weeknd

See also
 73rd Golden Globe Awards
 88th Academy Awards
 68th Primetime Emmy Awards
 70th Tony Awards

References

External links
 

2016 music awards
2016 in Los Angeles
 058
2016 in American music
2016 awards in the United States
2016 in California
February 2016 events in the United States